This was the first edition of the tournament.

Dayana Yastremska won the title after defeating Katarina Zavatska 6–0, 6–1 in the final.

Seeds

Draw

Finals

Top half

Bottom half

References
Main Draw

Ladies Open Dunakeszi - Singles